Adam Stephen Topolski (born 25 December 1951) is a retired Polish football defender who played professionally Poland and the United States.  Since his retirement in 1988, he has amassed a considerable resume as a coach in Poland.

Player
In 1964, Topolski signed with the local Vitcovia Witkowo.  In 1969, he played briefly for Warta Poznań before moving to Górnik Konin where he played from 1969 to 1973.  That year, he moved to Legia Warsaw.  In 1982, Topolski left Poland for the United States where he signed with the Pittsburgh Spirit of the Major Indoor Soccer League.  The Spirit folded in 1986.  On June 17, 1986, the Los Angeles Lazers signed Topolski.  He played two seasons in Los Angeles before retiring and returning to Poland where he became a coach.  Over twenty years, Topolski has coached over a dozen teams, most for a single season.

References

External links
 MISL stats
 
 Adam Topolski: Piłkarze wzniosą się na wyżyny
 Legia Warszawa: Adam Topolski

Living people
1951 births
Los Angeles Lazers players
Lech Poznań managers
Legia Warsaw players
Major Indoor Soccer League (1978–1992) players
Pittsburgh Spirit players
Polish footballers
Polish expatriate footballers
Polish football managers
Warta Poznań players
Zawisza Bydgoszcz managers
Zagłębie Lubin managers
People from Gniezno County
Sportspeople from Greater Poland Voivodeship
Association football defenders
Expatriate soccer players in the United States
Polish expatriate sportspeople in the United States